Jacopo Peri (20 August 156112 August 1633), known under the pseudonym Il Zazzerino, was an Italian composer and singer of the transitional period between the Renaissance and Baroque styles, and is often called the inventor of opera. He wrote the first work to be called an opera today, Dafne (around 1597), and also the first opera to have survived to the present day, Euridice (1600).

Biography
Peri was born in either Rome or Florence to a middle-class family. Peri himself claimed to be from Rome, but considering the pro-Roman sentiments of the reigning Fernando de'Medici, it was a disadvantage to be known as a Florentine, which may have motivated Peri to lie about his true birthplace. Nonetheless, he was employed to sing at the Servite monastery of SS. Annunziati in the city of Florence. He likely received an education from the monastery school as well. Due to its size and favour with the Medici court, who attended mass each week, SS. Annunziati was a pipeline for many musical students into musical careers. Because of his talent and education, Peri was able to study in Florence with Cristofano Malvezzi, and went on to work in a number of churches there, both as an organist and as a singer. He subsequently began to work in the Medici court around September 1588, first as a tenor singer and keyboard player, and later as a composer. His earliest works were incidental music for plays, intermedi and madrigals.

In the 1590s, Peri became associated with Jacopo Corsi, the leading patron of music in Florence. They believed contemporary art was inferior to classical Greek and Roman works, and decided to attempt to recreate Greek tragedy, as they understood it. Their work added to that of the Florentine Camerata of the previous decade, which produced the first experiments in monody, the solo song style over continuo bass which eventually developed into recitative and aria. Peri and Corsi brought in the poet Ottavio Rinuccini to write a text, and the result, Dafne, though nowadays thought to be a long way from anything the Greeks would have recognized, is seen as the first work in a new form, opera.

Rinuccini and Peri next collaborated on Euridice. This was first performed on 6 October 1600 at the Palazzo Pitti for the wedding of Princess Maria de'Medici and Henry IV. Unlike Dafne, it has survived to the present day (though it is hardly ever staged, and then only as a historical curio). The work made use of recitatives, a new development which went between the arias and choruses and served to move the action along.

Peri produced a number of other operas, often in collaboration with other composers (such as La Flora with Marco da Gagliano), and also wrote a number of other pieces for various court entertainments. Few of his pieces are still performed today, and even by the time of his death, his operatic style was looking rather old-fashioned when compared to the work of relatively younger reformist composers such as Claudio Monteverdi. Peri's influence on those later composers, however, was large.

Works

 Jacopo Peri: Ai Lettori. Introduzione a 'Le Musiche sopra l'Euridice', revisione e note di Valter Carignano
 Jacopo Peri: Le Musiche sopra l'Euridice. Revisione e Note di Valter Carignano, L'Opera Rinata, Torino

References

Bibliography
"Jacopo Peri", in The New Grove Dictionary of Music and Musicians, ed. Stanley Sadie.  20 vol.  London, Macmillan Publishers Ltd., 1980. 
Carter, T. (1980). Jacopo Peri. Music & Letters, 61(2), 121–135. http://www.jstor.org/stable/733337

External links

1561 births
1633 deaths
16th-century classical composers
16th-century Italian composers
17th-century classical composers
17th-century Italian composers
17th-century male musicians
Italian Baroque composers
Italian male classical composers
Italian opera composers
Italian operatic tenors
Male opera composers
Musicians from Rome
Renaissance composers